Indramayu Regency is a regency (kabupaten) of West Java province of Indonesia. It covers an area of 2,099.42 km2, and had a population of 1,663,737 at the 2010 census and 1,834,434 at the 2020 census; the official estimate as at mid 2021 was 1,851,383. The town of Indramayu is its capital.

This regency is located on the northeastern corner of West Java. Its borders include:
North: Java Sea
East: Java Sea
South: Cirebon Regency and Majalengka Regency
West: Subang Regency
Southwest: Sumedang Regency.

Climate 

The Indramayu Regency has a tropical wet and dry Aw climate with two seasons, namely the rainy season and the dry season. The rainy season usually lasts from December to March. The dry season lasts from May to October. The average rainfall in the Indramayu Regency is 1300–1800 mm per year with the number of rainy days ranging from 90 to 140 rainy days per year. Due to its location on the coast, the average annual temperature of this area is quite high, ranging from 23° to 32 °C. The humidity level in most areas of Indramayu Regency ranges from 70 to 85% per year.

Administrative division
Indramayu Regency is administratively divided into thirty-one districts (kecamatan), listed below with their areas and their populations at the 2010 census and the 2020 census, together with the official estimates as at mid 2021.

Languages

In general, there are two regional languages ​​used by the people of Indramayu Regency, namely Javanese (Indramayu Dialect) and Sundanese. The Indramayu Javanese language (Indramayu Dialect) is used by the majority of the Indramayu people, in addition to the Indramayu Javanese language (Indramayu Dialect) in the southern and southwest regions using Sundanese. Sundanese Standard Sundanese There are two types of Sundanese used. First, the Priangan Sundanese or new phase Sundanese, which is used by the people in the Gantar sub-district and parts of Haurgeulis (bordering the Subang district), the southern Terisi District (which borders Majalengka and Sumedang Regencies), and the Karangjaya block in Mangunjaya village in Anjatan District. Sundanese Indramayu - there is also the original Sundanese Indramayu phase in the Indramayu Regency, namely in Ilir, Bulak, and Parean Girang villages in Kandanghaur District, and Lelea and Tamansari villages in Lelea District. The Sundanese phase of Old Sundanese is somewhat different from the new Sundanese phase due to temporal dialect differences. The most obvious difference is that in the ancient Sundanese language, there were no undak-usuk (levels of language). Old Sundanese also did not recognize the vowel /eu/, but only /e/. Not to mention the difference in vocabulary. Javanese There are currently three dialects of Javanese in Indramayu Regency. The majority are Dermayu dialects (Indramayu). But there is also a Javanese dialect of Cerbon (Cirebon), namely in Krangkeng Village, Kalianyar, and around it in Krangkeng District, which borders Cirebon Regency. The Tegal-Brebes dialect of Javanese language also exists in the western region of Indramayu Regency because in the 1920s there was migration from Tegal-Brebes to the region, namely in several villages or blocks in the Haurgeulis, Anjatan, Patrol, Sukra, and Bongas Districts. The Javanese language dialect Dermayu is mostly used by the people of Indramayu, which is about 1.85 million people. There are two levels in the Dermayu dialect of Javanese which is a social dialect (sociolect), namely the bagongan level or ngoko and the level of freedom or besiken or krama. It is estimated that the residents who control the freedom are around 20%-40%.

References

External links
 Official Site
 Photo Gallery